Spain competed at the 1996 Summer Olympics in Atlanta, United States. 289 competitors, 194 men and 95 women, took part in 157 events in 22 sports.

Medalists

|  style="text-align:left; width:78%; vertical-align:top;"|

| width="22%" align="left" valign="top" |

Archery

After their gold medal men's team performance four years earlier, Spain qualified only one archer for the 1996 Olympics. He lost his first match.

Men's individual competition:
Antonio Vazquez → Round of 64, 60th place (0-1)

Athletics

Men's 5,000 metres 
 Enrique Molina
 Qualification — 13:51.55
 Semifinal — 14:04.08
 Final — 13:12.91 (→ 7th place)

 Manuel Pancorbo
 Qualification — 13:57.42
 Semifinal — 14:39.64 (→ did not advance)

 Anacleto Jiménez
 Qualification — 14:16.57
 Semifinal — 13:50.90 (→ did not advance)

Men's 400m hurdles
Iñigo Monreal
 Heat — 52.23s (→ did not advance)

Oscar Pitillas
 Heat — 51.35s (→ did not advance)

 Salvador Vila
 Heat — 50.55s (→ did not advance)

Men's 3,000 metres steeplechase
 Elisardo de la Torre
 Heat — 8:42.75 (→ did not advance)

Men's long jump
 Jesús Oliván
 Qualification — 7.64m (→ did not advance)

Men's discus throw 
 David Martínez
 Qualification — NM (→ did not advance)

Men's decathlon 
 Antonio Peñalver
 Final result — 8307 points (→ 2nd place)

 Francisco Javier Benet
 Final result — 8107 points (→ 19th place)

Men's marathon
Martín Fiz — 2:13.20 (→ 4th place)
Alberto Juzdado — 2:17.24 (→ 18th place)
Diego García — 2:22.11 (→ 53rd place)

Men's 50 km walk
 Valentí Massana — 3'44:19 (→  Bronze medal)
 Jaime Barroso — 4'01:09 (→ 22nd place)
 Jesús Ángel García — did not finish (→ no ranking)

Men's competition
 Abel Antón
 Alejandro Gómez
 Andrés Manuel Díaz
 Arturo Ortiz
 Carlos de la Torre
 Carlos Sala
 Daniel Plaza
 Elisardo de la Torre
 Fermín Cacho
 Fernando Vázquez
 Francisco Javier Navarro
 Frutos Feo
 Isaac Viciosa
 Javier García
 Jesús Font
 Jordi Mayoral
 José Manuel Arcos
 Juan Gabriel Concepción
 Manuel Francisco Borrega
 Manuel Martínez
 Miguel de los Santos
 Reyes Estévez
 Roberto Parra
 Venancio José Murcia

Women's 10.000 metres 
 Julia Vaquero
 Qualification — 32:27.05
 Final — 31:27.07 (→ 9th place)

Women's 400m hurdles
Miriam Alonso
 Qualification — 56.53 (→ did not advance)

Eva Paniagua
 Qualification — 58.10 (→ did not advance)

Women's heptathlon 
 Inmaculada Clapés
 Final result — 5602 points (→ 24th place)

Women's marathon
Rocío Ríos — 2:30.50 (→ 5th place)
Mónica Pont — 2:33.27 (→ 14th place)
Ana Isabel Alonso — 2:44.12 (→ 49th place)

Women's 10 km walk
 María Vasco — 46:09 (→ 28th place)
 Encarna Granados — did not finish (→ no ranking)

 Ana Amelia Menéndez
 Cristina Petite
 Julia Vaquero
 María Concepción Paredes
 María Isabel Martínez
 María José Mardomingo
 María Teresa Zúñiga
 Marta Domínguez
 Sandra Myers

Beach volleyball

Javier Bosma and Sixto Jimenez — 7th place overall
Miguel Prieto and José Yuste — 17th place overall

Boxing

Men's flyweight (– 48 kg)
Rafael Lozano →  Bronze medal
 First round — Defeated Joseph Benhard (Namibia), 10-2 
 Second round — Defeated Masibulele Makepula (South Africa), 14-3 
 Quarterfinals — Defeated La Paene Masara (Indonesia), 10-9 
 Semifinals — Lost to Mansueto Velasco (Philippines), 10-22

Canoeing

Cycling

Road competition
Men's individual time trial
Miguel Induráin
 Final — 1:04:05 (→  Gold medal)

Abraham Olano
 Final — 1:04:17 (→  Silver medal)

Women's individual road race
Joane Somarriba 
 Final — 02:37:06 (→ 21st place)

Fátima Blázquez 
 Final — 02:46:27 (→ 40th place)

Izaskun Bengoa 
 Final — did not finish (→ no ranking)

Women's individual time trial
Joane Somarriba 
 Final — 38:55 (→ 13th place)

Track competition
Men's points race
 Juan Llaneras
 Final — 17 points (→ 6th place)

Mountain bike
Men's cross-country
 Jokin Mújika
 Final — 2:41:15 (→ 22nd place)

Women's cross-country
 Laura Blanco
 Final — 2:04.20 (→ 20th place)

 Silvia Rovira
 Final — 2:09.17 (→ 26th place)

Diving

Men's 3m springboard
José Miguel Gil
 Preliminary heat — 295.47 (→ did not advance, 31st place)

Rafael Álvarez
 Preliminary heat — 208.83 (→ did not advance, 36th place)

Women's 3m springboard
Julia Cruz
 Preliminary heat — 205.32 (→ did not advance, 26th place)

Women's 10m platform
Dolores Sáez
 Preliminary heat — 216.36 (→ did not advance, 27th place)

Equestrianism

Fencing

Eleven fencers, nine men and two women, represented Spain in 1996.

Men's foil
 Javier García
 José Francisco Guerra

Men's épée
 César González
 Oscar Fernández
 Fernando de la Peña

Men's team épée
 Oscar Fernández, César González, Raúl Maroto

Men's sabre
 Fernando Medina
 Raúl Peinador
 Antonio García

Men's team sabre
 Antonio García, Fernando Medina, Raúl Peinador

Women's épée
 Taymi Chappé
 Rosa María Castillejo

Football

Gymnastics

Handball

Hockey

Men's tournament
Preliminary round (Group A):
 Spain — Germany 1-0
 Spain — Pakistan 3-0
 Spain — Argentina 2-1
 Spain — United States 7-1
 Spain — India 1-3 
Semifinals:
 Spain — Australia 2-1
Final:
 Spain — Netherlands 1-3 →  Silver medal

Team roster
 Jaime Amat
 Pablo Amat
 Javier Arnau
 Jordi Arnau
 Óscar Barrena
 Ignacio Cobos
 Juan Dinarés
 Juan Escarré
 Xavier Escudé
 Juantxo García-Mauriño
 Antonio González
 Ramón Jufresa
 Joaquín Malgosa
 Víctor Pujol
 Ramón Sala
 Pablo Usoz

Women's tournament
Preliminary round robin:
 Spain — Australia 0-4
 Spain — Germany 1-2
 Spain — Argentina 0-1
 Spain — Great Britain 2-2
 Spain — South Korea 0-2
 Spain — Netherlands 2-4 
 Spain — United States 0-2 (→ 8th and last place)

Team roster
 Begoña Larzabal
 Elena Carrión
 Elena Urkizu
 Lucía López
 María Carmen Barea
 María Cruz González
 María Victoria González
 Maider Tellería
 María del Mar Feito
 Mónica Rueda
 Nagore Gabellanes
 Natalia Dorado
 Silvia Manrique
 Sonia Barrio
 Sonia de Ignacio
 Teresa Motos

Judo

Men's competition
Ernesto Pérez
José Tomás Toro
León Villar
Roberto Naveira

Women's competition
Almudena Muñoz
Cristina Curto
Isabel Fernández
Sara Alvarez
Yolanda Soler

Rhythmic gymnastics

Rowing

Men

Women

Qualification Legend: FA=Final A (medal); FB=Final B (non-medal); FC=Final C (non-medal); FD=Final D (non-medal); FE=Final E (non-medal); FF=Final F (non-medal); SA/B=Semifinals A/B; SC/D=Semifinals C/D; SE/F=Semifinals E/F; QF=Quarterfinals; R=Repechage

Sailing

Men

Women

Open

Match racing

Shooting

Men

Women

Swimming

Men's 50m freestyle
 Juan Benavides
 Heat — 23.36 (→ did not advance, 30th place)

Men's 100m freestyle
 Juan Benavides
 Heat — 51.20 (→ did not advance, 33rd place)

Men's 1500m freestyle
 Frederik Hviid
 Heat — 15:42.40 (→ did not advance, 21st place)

Men's 100m backstroke
 Martin López-Zubero
 Heat — 55.36
 Final — 55.22 (→ 4th place)

Men's 200m backstroke
 Martin López-Zubero
 Heat — 2:00.77
 Final — 2:00.74 (→ 6th place)

Men's 100m breaststroke
 Marc Capdevila
 Heat — 1:02.69
 B-final — 1:03.51 (→ 15th place)

Men's 200m breaststroke
 Joaquín Fernández
 Heat — 2:16.05
 B-final — 2:16.05 (→ 12th place)

Men's 200m butterfly
 José Luis Ballester
 Heat — 2:02.69 (→ did not advance, 29th place)

Men's 400m individual medley
 Frederik Hviid
 Heat — 4:23.67
 B-final — 4:22.47 (→ 9th place)

Women's 50m freestyle
 Claudia Franco
 Heat — 26.17
 B-final — 26.04 (→ 11th place)

 Blanca Cerón
 Heat — 26.30 (→ 22nd place)

Women's 100m freestyle
 Claudia Franco
 Heat — 57.00 (→ did not advance, 21st place)

Women's 400m freestyle
 Itziar Esparza
 Heat — 4:19.45 (→ did not advance, 19th place)

Women's 800m freestyle
 Itziar Esparza
 Heat — 8:50.22 (→ did not advance, 18th place)

Women's 100m backstroke
 Eva Piñera
 Heat — 1:04.41 (→ did not advance, 20th place)

Women's 200m backstroke
 Ivette María
 Heat — 2:18.72 (→ did not advance, 23rd place)

Women's 100m breaststroke
 María Olay
 Heat — 1:12.58 (→ did not advance, 28th place)

Women's 200m breaststroke
 Lourdes Becerra
 Heat — 2:33.80 (→ did not advance, 22nd place)

Women's 100m butterfly
 María Peláez
 Heat — 1:01.99 (→ did not advance, 19th place)

Women's 200m butterfly
 María Peláez
 Heat — 2:13.85
 B-final — 2:13.05 (→ 11th place)

 Bárbara Franco
 Heat — 2:13.34
 B-final — 2:14.16 (→ 16th place)

Women's 200m individual medley
 Silvia Parera
 Heat — 2:17.67
 B-final — 2:19.92 (→ 16th place)

Women's 400m individual medley
 Lourdes Becerra
 Heat — 4:45.54
 B-final — 4:45.17 (→ 7th place)

Women's 4 × 100 m freestyle relay
 Blanca Cerón, Fátima Madrid, Susanna Garabatos and Claudia Franco
 Heat — 3:49.47 (→ did not advance, 14th place)

Women's 4 × 100 m medley relay
 Eva Piñera, María Olay, María Peláez and Claudia Franco
 Heat — 4:15.63 (→ did not advance, 15th place)

Tennis

Men's singles competition
 Albert Costa
 First round — Defeated Sébastien Lareau (Canada) 7-6 6-4
 Second round — Lost to Fernando Meligeni (Brazil) 6-7 4-6

 Carlos Costa
 First round — Lost to Andrea Gaudenzi (Italy) 3-6 2-6

 Sergi Bruguera
 First round — Defeated Andrei Pavel (Romania) 2-6 6-1 8-6
 Second round — Defeated Arnaud Boetsch (France) 7-6 4-6 6-2
 Third round — Defeated Greg Rusedski (Great Britain) 7-6 7-5
 Quarterfinals — Defeated MaliVai Washington (USA) 7-6 4-6 7-5
 Semifinals — Defeated Fernando Meligeni (Brazil) 7-6 6-2
 Final — Lost to Andre Agassi (USA) 2-6 3-6 1-6 (→  Silver medal)

Women's singles competition
 Arantxa Sánchez Vicario 
 First round — Defeated Dominique Van Roost (Belgium) 6-1 7-5
 Second round — Defeated Silvia Farina (Italy) 6-1 6-3
 Third round — Defeated Brenda Schultz-McCarthy (Netherlands) 6-4 7-6
 Quarterfinals — Defeated Kimiko Date (Japan) 4-6 6-3 10-8
 Semifinals — Defeated Jana Novotná (Czech Republic) 6-4 1-6 6-3
 Final — Lost to Lindsay Davenport (USA) 6-7 2-6 (→  Silver medal)

 Conchita Martínez
 First round — Defeated Patty Schnyder (Switzerland) 6-1 6-2
 Second round — Defeated Radka Zrubáková (Slovakia) 6-1 6-4
 Third round — Defeated Natasha Zvereva (Belarus) 6-2 7-5
 Quarterfinals — Lost to Mary Joe Fernández (USA) 6-3 2-6 3-6

 Virginia Ruano Pascual
 First round — Defeated Magdalena Grzybowska (Poland) 6-4 6-2
 Second round — Lost to Iva Majoli (Croatia) 5-7 3-6

Water polo

Men's tournament
Preliminary round (Group A)
 Spain — Germany 9-3
 Spain — Netherlands 8-7
 Spain — Yugoslavia 7-9
 Spain — Hungary 7-8
 Spain — Russia 8-6
Quarterfinals
 Spain — United States 5-4
Semifinals
 Spain — Hungary 7-6
Final
 Spain — Croatia 7-5 (→  Gold medal)

Team roster
 Ángel Andreo
 Carles Sans
 Daniel Ballart
 Iván Moro
 Jesús Rollán
 Jordi Sans
 Jorge Payá
 Josep María Abarca
 Manuel Estiarte
 Miguel Ángel Oca
 Pedro Francisco García
 Salvador Gómez
 Sergi Pedrerol

Weightlifting

Notes

References

Nations at the 1996 Summer Olympics
1996
Olympics